The 1993 Eastern Michigan Eagles football team represented Eastern Michigan University in the 1993 NCAA Division I-A football season. In their first season under head coach Ron Cooper, the Eagles compiled a 4–7 record (3–5 against conference opponents), finished in a tie for seventh place in the Mid-American Conference, and were outscored by their opponents, 220 to 163. The team's statistical leaders included Michael Armour with 1,208 passing yards, Melvin Green with 488 rushing yards, and Anthony Cicchelli with 616 receiving yards.

Schedule

References

Eastern Michigan
Eastern Michigan Eagles football seasons
Eastern Michigan Eagles football